Kim Yu-seok (born 22 September 1966) is a South Korean actor. He starred in the films The Power of Kangwon Province (1998), The Isle (2000), Possible Changes (2005), Long and Winding Road (2006), and Family Matters (2006), as well as the television series Reservation for Love (2002), Thank You, My Life (2006), My Lovely Fool (2006), White Lie (2008) and The King's Dream (2012).

Filmography

Film

Television series

Awards and nominations

References

External links 
 Kim Yu-seok at DMCC Entertainment 
 Kim Yu-seok Fan Cafe at Daum 
 
 
 
 
 

1966 births
Living people
South Korean male television actors
South Korean male film actors
Dongguk University alumni
20th-century South Korean male actors
21st-century South Korean male actors
Gimhae Kim clan